Dance Dance Revolution DVD Game is a 2006 DVD-based game in the Dance Dance Revolution series (or DDR series) hosted by Roxee, a member of the Australian children's entertainment property, The Funkees. It is unique from other DDR games for a number of reasons. It was the first DDR game not to be developed by the creators of the original series, Konami. The only other non-Konami-developed DDR game is the Disney Channel Edition. To date it remains the only game neither developed nor published by Konami and, perhaps more significantly, it is the only game in the series which lacks input.

Gameplay

Although several members of the Plug-n-Play subseries of DDR games (most notably My First Dance Dance Revolution) featured simplified (2-step) or smaller scale dance pads for children, the 2 dance pads which come bundled with Dance Dance Revolution DVD Game are scaled-back to the point where they no longer allow input to the game. The reason for this is that as a game intended for players of ages 5 and older, those players on the younger end of the spectrum could have technical difficulties in gameplay and, as such, input can be seen as akin to maladaptation. Rather, the Dance Dance Revolution DVD Game instruction booklet sets up a subjective scoring system where 1-4 players vote on each other's dance moves (style) and adherence to the rhythm.

Music
Dance Dance Revolution DVD Game features 30 unique songs referred to as Dance Sessions. As these songs are played the exuberant host and personal dance instructor, Roxee, encourages players and exhorts them to keep up the good work. The energetic Roxee is a member of the Australian children's entertainment property, The Funkees.

Dance Sessions featured are listed in the following table:

Reception
Dance Dance Revolution DVD Game was released in 2006 for the North American (NTSC) market and in 2007 for the UK and Australian (PAL) markets. Since its release, sales were lackluster despite earning the National Parenting Center's "Seal of Approval." GameSetWatch's Simon Carless anecdotally suggests that when a player learns that the game mat doesn't have any connection to the DVD player, "a little piece inside of him die[s]." Kotaku's Brian Ashcraft emphatically denounced the product as "not a game." Due to its membership in Konami's Dance Dance Revolution series, however, it has been purchased by collectors and investors speculating on future collectible value.

See also
Imagination Games
Dance Dance Revolution (TV games)

References

External links
Dance Dance Revolution DVD Game product page
The Funkees homepage

2006 video games
Dance Dance Revolution games
DVD interactive technology
Video games developed in Australia